Elevator Madness is an album by New Zealand composer Peter Jefferies, released on October 22, 1996 through Emperor Jones.

Track listing

Personnel 
Mark Cohen – engineering
Peter Jefferies – vocals, piano, keyboards, drums, guitar, bass guitar, cello
Jean Smith – production, guitar on "Elevator Madness", "Loop" and "Shut Out", keyboards on "Sunset"

References

External links 
 

1996 albums
Peter Jefferies albums